Raiatea or Ra'iatea (Tahitian: Ra‘iātea) is the second largest of the Society Islands, after Tahiti, in French Polynesia. The island is widely regarded as the "centre" of the eastern islands in ancient Polynesia and it is likely that the organised migrations to the Hawaiian Islands, New Zealand and other parts of East Polynesia started at Raiatea.

A traditional name for the island is Havai'i, homeland of the Māori people. Situated on the southeast coast is the historical Taputapuatea marae, which was established by 1000 CE. The site was the political and religious center of eastern Polynesia for several centuries, and was inscribed on the UNESCO World Heritage List in 2017 for its historical significance.

The main township on Raiatea is Uturoa, the administrative centre for the Leeward Islands (French Îles Sous-le-vent). There are also colleges which serve as the main educational location for secondary schools for students from the regional islands of Bora Bora, Tahaa, Huahine and Maupiti.

Etymology

The Tahitian language name  means bright sky.  "Ulitea" is an obsolete transcription commonly used in the 19th century.

The extinct Raiatea starling inhabited the island; there is only one drawing of it in the world – in the Natural History Museum, London.

History

The Polynesian navigator Tupaia, who sailed with explorer James Cook, was born in Raiatea around 1725.  Cook visited Raiatea in 1769 and again in 1773–1774. He named the island "Ulitea". Omai (c.1751–1780), another young man from Raiatea, travelled with European explorers to London in 1774 and also served as an interpreter to Captain Cook on his second and third journeys.

Prehistory 
In ancient times the island was called Havai'i, a sacred name in Polynesian culture and related to the names of Hawaii; Savai'i, in Samoa; and Havaiki, the ancient name for Fakarava in the Tuamotu. According to recent findings, the Society Islands were colonized from Samoa and Tonga around 200 B.C., about the same time as the Marquesas. Together with the Marquesas, they formed the heart of Polynesia and thus the springboard for the settlement of Hawaii, New Zealand and Mangareva.

Favored by Raiatea's geography, with valleys bounded by rocky ridges and open to the sea, nine independent tribal principalities emerged, which in turn subdivided into individual clans. This led to a strictly stratified social pattern, society was divided into several separate social levels. At the top were the ariki or ari'i, the noble chiefs whose claim to leadership was legitimized by their descent from the founding ancestors. They were landowners and undisputed political and religious leaders.

In the Society islands they exercised great religious and cultural influence. The great temple (in Tahitian marae) of Taputapuatea, dedicated to the god Oro, was the most important religious center of the islands. His cult supplanted other traditional gods such as Taaroa and Tane, and the different marae were subsidiary to that of Taputapuatea. Around him the sect was formed, a religious, aristocratic, warlike and festive mixture, which was respected in all the islands and achieved, only with its presence and its taboo character, a truce in the tribal wars.

European colonization 
Raiatea was discovered for Europe by James Cook on July 20, 1769, during his first voyage. Coming from Tahiti, he sailed with the Endeavour through the Avamo'a Reef passage, sacred to the Polynesians, anchored in Opoa Bay and landed near the Marae Taputapuatea. He hoisted the Union Jack and took possession of the island for the British Crown in a brief ceremony.

To expand the Spanish sphere of influence, King Charles III ordered expeditions to the South Pacific. The governor of Chile and viceroy of Peru Manuel d'Amat i de Junyent (1704–1782) sent Domingo de Boenechea with the frigate El Águila, which arrived at Raiatea in 1772. He called the island Princesa and took possession of it for Spain. However, the annexation had no political consequences.

Although neighboring Tahiti was already under the influence of European powers in the late 18th century and formally came under French protectorate in 1842, the clans of Raiatea fiercely resisted annexation efforts. However, Christian missionaries managed to gain increasing influence, which led to religious wars between followers of the traditional and Christian faiths.

With the support of the Europeans, King Pomare II of Tahiti was able to declare himself sovereign of the entire archipelago. On November 12, 1815, Pomaré's adversaries, the followers of the old faith, were decisively defeated at the Battle of Feipi. In 1828, the Marae Taputapuatea was destroyed. In 1831, the Mamaia sect, successor to the already banned Arioi, again succeeded in expelling the missionaries from Raiatea. In 1832, the Mamaia were finally defeated and banished. The missionaries returned and France tried to gain more and more influence.

As early as 1842, Rear Admiral Abel Aubert Dupetit-Thouars had claimed the Society Islands on behalf of France. However, France's King Louis-Philippe initially hesitated to sign the annexation announced by Du Petit-Thouars, fearing conflicts of interest with Great Britain, which also claimed them. As Queen Pomaré IV of Tahiti was pro-British and more attached to the Protestant missionaries, she allowed herself to be taken to Raiatea in this ambiguous situation in 1844 and ruled from there until 1847.

In 1880, France proclaimed a provisional protectorate over Raiatea and Tahaa. After Pomaré V ceded all his rights to France, the Society Islands were finally annexed in March 1888 and became a colony of France. However, rebellions continued to occur in Raiatea. In 1888, the tribal chief Teraupo entrenched himself in the Avera Valley on the east coast and resisted French intervention. It was only in 1897 that he fell into captivity and was exiled to New Caledonia. 190 of his followers were forcibly relocated with their families to the island of Ua Huka.

King Tamatoa VI was the last monarch, reigning from 1884 to 1888.

Geography 
With a total area of 175 km², it is the second largest island of the Society archipelago, after Tahiti. A coral reef surrounds the islands of Raiatea and Tahaa which share the same lagoon. The maximum altitude is 1,017 m on Mount Tefatoaiti.

The total population was 16,438 inhabitants in the 2002 census, distributed in three communes: Uturoa (the capital), Taputapuatea and Tumara'a. Uturoa is also the administrative capital of the Leeward Islands and the second urban center of French Polynesia, after Papeete.

The main island is of volcanic origin and consists mainly of igneous rocks. On the fringing reef and in the lagoon there are numerous white coral sand motu and rubble.

Tahaa extends north of Raiatea, the two islands are separated by a 3 km strait. According to legend, it is the work of an enchanted moray eel possessed by the spirit of a deceased princess. The boat trip from Raiatea to Tahaa across the lagoon only takes about 20 minutes. Raiatea's landscape is characterized by rugged peaks, a heavily indented coastline with deeply indented bays and numerous small, tiny islands located in the lagoon. 

The most beautiful sandy beaches are found on these motu, while the rocky coastline of the main island of Raiatea has no beaches worth mentioning. From the peaks, the highest of which is Toomaru at 1032 m,10 steeply sloping valleys and gorges open out to the sea, separated by narrow rocky ridges. The numerous streams often form spectacular waterfalls. The eastward-flowing Apoomau River rises in the 1017 m high Tefatoatiti,11 and flows into Faaroa Bay. It is the only navigable river in Polynesia and, depending on the water level, can be traveled a few kilometers in small boats.

Cultivated land and settlements are found in a narrow coastal strip; the interior of Raiatea is largely uninhabited.

Climate 
The climate is tropical and humid. The average annual temperature is 26 °C, with negligible differences between months. The average annual rainfall is about 1800 mm. The rainiest month is December, but the rains are, as usual in the tropics, intense and of short duration. The (winter) months of August and September are quite dry.

Flora and fauna 
The vegetation of French Polynesia is characterized by two peculiarities: a high proportion of endemic plants and a relative scarcity of species. The isolated location of the islands and the fact that they have never been connected to a continental landmass explain the high number of endemic plants. In the South Pacific, plants range from west to east. This caused the biodiversity of the islands to decrease eastward. For example, the islands of New Guinea and New Caledonia, located in the west, have a much higher number of species compared to Raiatea. In contrast, the islands of the Tuamotu Archipelago, the Pitcairn Islands and Easter Island in the far eastern Pacific are much less species-rich.

In almost 2,000 years of settlement history, humans have decisively changed the flora of Raiatea with cultivation, especially in the fertile coastal areas. Coconut palms, breadfruit trees, taro, yams, cassava, sweet potatoes and various tropical fruits are grown as food crops, including a particularly tasty pineapple. Pineapple and vanilla fruits are exported and grown on small family farms.

Significant remnants of the original vegetation have survived in the inaccessible, lush interior of the island, although the native plant communities are now threatened by guava bushes, bamboo thickets and other anthropogenic plants.

One plant that only grows in Raiatea is the fragrant tiare apetahi. It is now critically endangered and only grows on Mount Temehani. The following legend is associated with the fragrant yellowish-white flower: A princess who died in the arms of her beloved promised to hold his hand tenderly every time she climbed Mount Tamehani. When she climbed the mountain the next morning, she saw wonderfully fragrant flowers growing everywhere, with five petals reaching out to him like hands. He dug up a plant to plant in the garden in memory of his beloved, but it withered within a few days.

One endemic bird was the brown-headed parakeet (Cyanoramphus ulietanus). It was discovered by Captain Cook's crew. After an eventful stay in Tahiti, where Captain Cook also witnessed a human sacrifice, he left on September 29, 1777, to explore other islands in the atoll. He first went to nearby Eimeo (present-day Maiao), where he stayed briefly, and then headed for Ulitea (present-day Raiatea), which is only a few days northwest of Tahiti. During his 34-day stay, a unique parrot was collected on the island. At least two specimens have been preserved for posterity and are in museums in London and Vienna. Unfortunately, there are no reports on the way of life of this parakeet.

During his time at Raiatea, Cook had the ships Resolution and Discovery brought ashore for urgent maintenance work. It is possible that this time was sufficient for Rats, Cockroaches and other vermin to wash ashore, and it appears that it was they that sealed the brown-headed parakeet's demise.

Mammals did not originally exist on the Society Islands, they were all introduced by Humans. Already the early Polynesian settlers brought dogs, pigs, chickens and the Pacific rat as food animals, and Europeans introduced goats, cows, sheep and horses. The indigenous land animals are only insects, land crabs, snails and lizards. In Raiatea there are no animals dangerous to humans. Sand fleas on the beach and Mosquitoes, which are everywhere in the interior of the island, can be unpleasant.

The marine fauna of the lagoon and coral reef is very rich in species. In addition to hundreds of different coral fish, divers can observe numerous mollusks, echinoderms and crustaceans from the tropical sea. The waters surrounding Raiatea and Tahaa are known for their rich population of colorful Nudibranchs. The reefs are dotted with grottoes and caves that provide shelter for many marine creatures. Among divers, the "octopus grotto", located between Raiatea and Tahaa, is well known. Behind the reef are sharks, rays, swordfish and sea turtles.

Administration
Politically, Raiatea today belongs to French Polynesia. The island is a French overseas territory and is therefore associated with the European Union. It is administered by a subdivision (Subdivision administrative des Îles Sous-le-Vent) of the High Commission of French Polynesia (Haut-commissariat de la République en Polynésie française) based in Papeete.

The island is divided into three communes (municipalities):
Uturoa
Taputapuatea
Tumaraa

These three communes are inside the administrative subdivision of the Leeward Islands.

Raiatea had a total of 12,832 inhabitants according to 2012 data, with a population density of 66 inhabitants/km².

The official language is French. The currency is the CFP franc, which is pegged to the euro. The administrative budget of the Society Islands is substantially subsidized by French and EU funds.

The main town is Uturoa, in the north of the island, which is also the administrative and economic center of the Leeward Islands.

Economy
The island economy is mainly agricultural with exports of vanilla, pineapple and coconut. The plant Nono (or noni) (Morinda citrifolia) is also grown. Fa'aroa Valley is a large and important agricultural region with the rural economy and the cultivation of vanilla supported by a local research facility. Pearl farming is also an important industry while farming cattle, sheep and pigs has recently decreased. There is less tourism compared to the other islands in the archipelago. The local tourist infrastructure comprises boarding houses, two marinas, a four star hotel, The Hawaiki Nui and a port for visiting cruise ships. There is also a fledgling local industry in the maintenance of yachts and shipbuilding. The main source of employment is the island's public service and the consumer market. Raiatea has a small road that runs around the entire island. Raiatea Airport is an airport in Uturoa.

Tourism 
Although the island has several hotels up to the luxury category, Raiatea is quieter and less developed in terms of tourism compared to Tahiti and Bora Bora. Raiatea is especially attractive to offshore sailors. There are several yacht charter companies, and the island is often referred to as the nautical center of Polynesia. There are marinas with good infrastructure in Uturoa and Baie Faaroa to the west. The island is visited by cruise ships from time to time.

Places of interest 
The somewhat sleepy-looking main town of Uturoa offers no special attractions. For cruise ship tourists, the port's reception terminal was redesigned a few years ago, a small park was laid out and the esplanade was paved with natural stones from the island in various colors. Portuguese craftsmen were in charge of laying the beautiful motifs in traditional Portuguese style. The botanical garden of Uturoa is interesting with many rare and exotic plants.

The main attraction of Raiatea is undoubtedly the Taputapuatea place of worship. It comprises several worship platforms (marae) that were originally distributed in a sacred grove surrounded by tabu. Several of the sites have been restored. The largest platform was built in the early 17th century with huge upright limestone slabs and is dedicated to Oro, the god of war.

There are other important ceremonial sites on the island. In the Avera valley, north of Opoa on the east coast, is another large ceremonial platform. Nearby, archaeological excavations have uncovered the remains of dwellings and stone tool workshops. The ceremonial site at Tainuu, on the northwest coast, is also well preserved. In addition to the imposing coral rock slabs with which the marae were delimited, petroglyphs are also preserved here. On this site, sacred to the Polynesians, missionaries built a church in the 19th century.

An interesting destination for divers is the wreck of the Nordby, a Danish trimotor that sank around 1900. The wreck, very well preserved, is located at a depth of about 20 m, not far from the Pearl Beach Resort on the northeast coast.

Infrastructure 

The island is surrounded by a 98 km road, while another road runs through the center. Since the 1980s, numerous infrastructure works have been carried out to improve the road network and open up the southern part of the island by building bridges, asphalting and installing electricity, telephone and drinking water distribution networks.

The port of Uturoa was remodeled in the early 2000s, allowing cruise ships such as the Tahitian Princess, the Gauguin, the Amsterdam and the World to make weekly calls during the tourist season. Raiatea is the administrative capital of the Leeward Islands and the residence of the state administrator.

There is a hospital, a general secondary school (called LUT, which celebrates its 60th anniversary in May 2021) and a vocational school, three secondary schools (one of which is private) and several primary schools and kindergartens.

Raiatea is the only French Polynesian island (outside of Tahiti) with a secondary school. Therefore, most students from neighboring islands, such as Bora-Bora, Tahaa, Maupiti or Huahine, come here for their secondary education. The island also has an airfield, a commercial port, a market and two marinas.

See also 
 List of volcanoes in French Polynesia
Overseas France
Dependent Territory
 Poedua

References